FreeIPA is a free and open source identity management system. FreeIPA is the upstream open-source project for Red Hat Identity Management.

Overview 
FreeIPA aims to provide a centrally managed Identity, Policy, and Audit (IPA) system. It uses a combination of Fedora Linux, 389 Directory Server, MIT Kerberos, NTP, DNS, the DogTag certificate system, SSSD and other free/open-source components. FreeIPA includes extensible management interfaces (CLI, Web UI, XMLRPC and JSONRPC API) and Python SDK for the integrated CA, and BIND with a custom plugin for the integrated DNS server. Each of the major components of FreeIPA operates as a preexisting free/open-source project. The bundling of these components into a single manageable suite with a comprehensive management interface is GPLv3, but that does not change the licenses of the components.

Since version 3.0.0, FreeIPA uses Samba to integrate with Microsoft's Active Directory by way of Cross Forest Trusts. FreeIPA provides support for Linux, Unix-based, Windows and Mac OS X computers.

Software components

Popular plugins

Releases

See also 

 List of LDAP software
 Active Directory
 Apple Open Directory
 Identity management
 List of single sign-on implementations

References

External links 
 

Free software programmed in C
Free software programmed in Python
Identity management systems
Red Hat software